Robert Peterson (August 15, 1909 – January 10, 1979) was an American art director. He received an Academy Award nomination in the category of Best Art Direction for the 1940 film Arizona. He died at the age of 69 in Los Angeles.

Selected filmography
 Arizona (1940)

References

External links

1909 births
1979 deaths
American art directors